Abul Qasim Nomani (Arabic: مفتي أبوالقاسم نعماني) is an Indian Sunni Muslim scholar and the current Vice Chancellor of Darul Uloom Deoband. He is ranked among  The 500 Most Influential Muslims.

Biography
Abul Qasim Nomani was born in Varanasi (Banaras) UP on 14 January 1947. He graduated from Darul Uloom Deoband in 1967. He became a member of Majlis-Ash-Shura (Governing Body) of Darul Uloom in 1992.

Nomani was appointed as Vice-Chancellor of Darul Uloom Deoband on 24 July 2011 after Ghulam Mohammad Vastanvi. 

On 14 October 2020, Nomani was appointed as the Hadīth professor in Deoband seminary.

References

External links 
Times of India
Deoband Online News
http://www.islah-ul-muslimeen.com/index.php 

Deobandis
1947 births
Living people
Indian Sufis
Chishti Order
People from Varanasi
Darul Uloom Deoband alumni

Vice-Chancellors of Darul Uloom Deoband